Höcker (also transliterated Hoecker in other languages) is a German surname. Notable people with the surname include:

 Bernhard Hoëcker, German comedian
Carl Hoecker, Inspector General of the U.S. Securities and Exchange Commission
 Hanskurt Höcker, German Wehrmacht military officer
 Karl-Friedrich Höcker, German SS military officer
 Karl-Heinz Höcker, German theoretical nuclear physicist.
 Wilhelm Höcker, German politician
Four notable German writers:
Oskar Höcker (1840–1894)
Gustav Höcker (1832–1911) (Oskar's brother)
Paul Oskar Höcker (1865–1944) (Oskar's son)
Karla Höcker (1901–1992) (Paul Oskar's daughter)

See also
 Höcker Album, an album of photographs collected by SS officer Karl-Friedrich Höcker at Auschwitz-Birkenau
 Hoecker, Missouri, a community in the United States
 Hocker (disambiguation)

German-language surnames